Mertensia lanceolata, known as prairie bluebells, narrow-leaved languid lady, lance-leaved bluebells, and lance-leaved lungwort is a species of flowering plant native to western North America. A herbaceous perennial it has blue-green leaves alternately arranged on its smooth flowering stalk. Its flower buds are pink-purple and become more blue as they open. Accepted varieties include:

Mertensia lanceolata var. coriacea (A.Nelson) L.C.Higgins & S.L.Welsh
Mertensia lanceolata var. lanceolata
Mertensia lanceolata var. secundorum (Cockerell) Cockerell

Description 
Mertensia lanceolata is a variable species with flowering individuals typically  growing 20-35 cm in height. The species is found in Rocky Mountain habitats from the plains to alpine habitats. The leaves are blue-green due to the waxy coating with a prominent center vein. Immature plants will have a few distinctly lanceolate leaves arising from the ground on short stalks while plants mature enough to flower will typically have narrower leaves attached alternately attached to the flower stalk. 

The leaves or flower stalks arise from the large taproot. Flowering stalks lean outwards at an angle with multiple flowers hanging downwards from the top of the stalk. The flowers are five fused petals forming a short trumpet.

References

lanceolata
Flora of North America

Flora of Alberta
Flora of Colorado
Flora of Manitoba
Flora of Montana
Flora of Nebraska
Flora of Saskatchewan
Flora of South Dakota
Flora of New Mexico
Flora of North Dakota
Flora of Utah
Flora of Wyoming
Species described in 1846